Amta is a census town in West Bengal, India.

Amta or AMTA may also refer to:

 Amta I (community development block), West Bengal, India
 Amta II (community development block), West Bengal, India
 Amta (Vidhan Sabha constituency)
 Agricultural Market Transition Act
 Akershus Amtstidende, a Norwegian local newspaper
 Antenna Measurement Techniques Association
 Amta, now Smaalenenes Amtstidende, a Norwegian newspaper
 American Manufacturers of Toilet Articles, a previous name for the lobbying group Personal Care Products Council from 1922 to 1970